Kate Toncray (1867 – December 6, 1927) was an American actress of the silent era. She appeared in more than 170 films between 1905 and 1925. She was born in St. Louis, Missouri and died in Manhattan, New York City.

Selected filmography

 A Smoked Husband (1908)
 A Flash of Light (1910)
 His Trust (1911)
 Heart Beats of Long Ago (1911)
 Fisher Folks (1911)
 Her Awakening (1911)
 A Decree of Destiny (1911)
 Was He a Coward? (1911)
 The Spanish Gypsy (1911)
 The New Dress (1911)
 The Primal Call (1911)
 Fighting Blood (1911)
 The Indian Brothers (1911)
 Love in the Hills (1911)
 The Battle (1911)
 The Miser's Heart (1911)
 For His Son (1912)
 Under Burning Skies (1912)
 Won by a Fish (1912)
 One Is Business, the Other Crime (1912)
 An Outcast Among Outcasts (1912)
 The Sands of Dee (1912)
 The Inner Circle (1912)
 A Change of Spirit (1912)
 Blind Love (1912)
 Heredity (1912)
 A Welcome Intruder (1913)
 So Runs the Way (1913)
 Under the Shadow of the Law (1913)
 Red Hicks Defies the World (1913)
 The Wanderer (1913)
 The Lady and the Mouse (1913)
 The Hero of Little Italy (1913)
 Love in an Apartment Hotel (1913)
 Almost a Wild Man (1913)
 Brute Force (1914)
 Judith of Bethulia (1914)
 Old Heidelberg (1915)
 The Lamb (1915)
 Casey at the Bat (1916)
 Puppets (1916)
 The Little Yank (1917)
 Stage Struck (1917)
 Hands Up! (1917)
 Rebecca of Sunnybrook Farm (1917)
 The Hope Chest (1918)
 Boots (1919)
 Peppy Polly (1919)
 The Charm School (1921)
 Prisoners of Love (1921)
 The Match-Breaker (1921)
 Silent Years (1921)
 The Snowshoe Trail (1922)
 Bobbed Hair (1925)
 The Narrow Street (1925)

References

External links
 
 
  left to right: Blanche Sweet and Kate Toncray in an early Biograph

1867 births
1927 deaths
American silent film actresses
Actresses from St. Louis
20th-century American actresses